The 1977–78 A Group was the 30th season of the A Football Group, the top Bulgarian professional league for association football clubs, since its establishment in 1948.

Overview
It was contested by 16 teams, and Lokomotiv Sofia won the championship. This was the team’s fourth title overall.

League standings

Results

Champions
Lokomotiv Sofia

Top scorers

References

External links
Bulgaria - List of final tables (RSSSF)
1977–78 Statistics of A Group at a-pfg.com

First Professional Football League (Bulgaria) seasons
Bulgaria
1977–78 in Bulgarian football